Trilochana smaragdina is a moth of the family Sesiidae. It was known only from a single female from Papua, Indonesia, but has recently also been collected in Queensland, Australia.

External links
Image at CSIRO Entomology
Classification of the Superfamily Sesioidea (Lepidoptera: Ditrysia)

Moths of Australia
Sesiidae
Moths described in 1954